Sunlight Jr. is a 2013 American drama film directed by Laurie Collyer and starring Matt Dillon and Naomi Watts. The film is a poignant vignette following a couple expecting their first child. The couple must come to grips with their dire financial situation while in the midst of an unplanned pregnancy and its subsequent challenges. The film is inspired by Barbara Ehrenreich’s non-fiction book “Nickel and Dimed” which investigates many of the difficulties low-wage workers face.

Plot
Unmarried lovers Melissa, a convenience store clerk, and Richie, confined to a wheelchair since a motorcycle accident, try to make ends meet on her low wages and his disability check which he supplements with occasional handyman work. Their dire situation is illustrated early in the film when Richie is stranded in his car because he has run out of gas, yet he keeps spending money in bars. Soon they face eviction for non-payment of rent from the seedy motel in which they live, and an unplanned pregnancy for which they can't afford the medical bills. As a last resort they move in with Melissa’s alcoholic mother who makes money by taking foster children into her bedbug infested home.

Cast
 Naomi Watts as Melissa Winters
 Matt Dillon as Richie Barnes
 Norman Reedus as Justin 
 Tess Harper as Kathleen 
 Antoni Corone as Edwin 
 Adrienne Lovette as Vivian
 Vivian Fleming-Alvarez as Store Patron (uncredited)
 Keith Hudson as Micky
 Chloe Pombo as Foster Child
 Gustavo Escobar as Jeral 
 Victoria Vodar as Pretty Woman  (uncredited)
 Rachael Thompson as Crime and Punishment Woman
 Beth Marshall as Molly
 Gabriel Alexander as Kyle (uncredited)

Reception
 On Metacritic, the film holds an average score of 61 out of 100, based on 19 reviews, which indicates "generally favorable reviews."

Ronnie Scheib of Variety praised the film, saying "Incandescent performances by Naomi Watts and Matt Dillon and an unerring grasp of strip-mall-dominated Florida distinguish Sunlight Jr."
Frank Scheck of The Hollywood Reporter wrote: "Naomi Watts and Matt Dillon bring impressive emotional and physical heat to Sunlight Jr., director/screenwriter Laurie Collyer’s beautifully observed character study of an unmarried couple living on the economic margins."

Awards
The Tribeca Film Festival nominated writer direction Laurie Collyer in the category "Best Narrative Feature".

References

External links
 

2013 films
2013 drama films
American drama films
2010s English-language films
2010s American films